Over the years, Parliament-Funkadelic and the associated P-Funk musical collective, often referred to as the "Funk Mob," have included a tremendous number of musicians and singers. While some of their contributions have gone uncredited, the following individuals and bands contributed to various P-Funk projects; most of them have been credited on at least one album.

Out of 216 listed, the sixteen people whose names are shown in bold italics were inducted into the Rock and Roll Hall of Fame as members of Parliament-Funkadelic in 1997.  One other listed band member, Sly Stone, was inducted into the Hall in 1993 as the leader of Sly and the Family Stone.

 
P-Funk